The 1939–40 Copa México was the 24th staging of this Mexican football cup competition that existed from 1907 to 1997.

The competition started on March 28, 1940, and concluded on April 28, 1940, with the final held at the Parque Asturias in México City, in which Asturias lifted the trophy for seventh time after a 1–0 victory over Necaxa.

Final phase

QuarterFinals

Atlante eliminated, aggregate 6-4

Club América eliminated, aggregate 1-5

Club Deportivo Marte eliminated, aggregate 4-8

Semifinals

Club España eliminated, aggregate 3-6
Necaxa byes to Final

Final

References
Mexico - Statistics of Copa México in season 1939/1940. (RSSSF)

Copa MX
Copa
Mex